The World Heavyweight Championship is a professional wrestling world heavyweight championship in the Japanese promotion Pro Wrestling Zero1. It is one of Zero1's top two singles titles, along with the United National Heavyweight Championship. It was first introduced on December 15, 2007 when Zero1 ended their relationship with the AWA Superstars of Wrestling. The  AWA Superstars of Wrestling champion at the time, Masato Tanaka, was then recognized as the first Zero1 World Heavyweight Champion. To this day, Zero1 continues to use the AWA title belt, which reads "AWA World Heavyweight Wrestling Champion", to represent their world heavyweight championship. 

There have been a total of 20 recognized champions who have had a combined 31 official reigns. The current champion is Masato Tanaka who is in his sixth reign.

Title history

Combined reigns

Belt design
The standard Championship belt has three plates on a black leather strap.

References

External links
 ZEROONEUSA.com official championship page
 Wrestling-Titles.com title history
 TitleHistories.com title history
 World Heavyweight Championship (Zero1)

Pro Wrestling Zero1 championships
World heavyweight wrestling championships